Misopates calycinum is a species of annual herb in the family Plantaginaceae. They have simple leaves.

Sources

References 

calycinum